The 2009–10 Ohio State Buckeyes women's basketball team represented The Ohio State University in the 2009–10 NCAA Division I women's basketball season. The Buckeyes, coached by Jim Foster, successfully defended their Big Ten Conference regular-season and tournament championships. They advanced to the NCAA tournament, losing in the second round to Mississippi State.

Offseason
May 5: The Atlantic Coast Conference and the Big Ten Conference announced the pairings for the annual Big Ten/ACC Challenge for women’s basketball. The Buckeyes will travel to Durham, N.C., to take on the Duke Blue Devils Thursday, Dec. 3.
May 18: Following three days of team trials, USA Basketball today announced the 14 finalists for the 2009 USA Women’s U19 World Championship Team. The finalists will return to Colorado Springs on July 9 to begin training for the 2009 FIBA U19 World Championship. Buckeye Samantha Prahalis is one of the finalists.
May 18: USA Basketball also announced 14 finalists for the 2009 USA Women's World University Games Team. The finalists included Buckeyes player Jantel Lavender.
July 29: The 2009 USA U19 World Championship Team (5-1) defeated Japan (2-4) 109-68 in FIBA U19 World Championship second round action on Wednesday afternoon in Bangkok, Thailand. Ohio State’s Samantha Prahalis hit a pair of threes and contributed 12 points.

July 30: The Women's Basketball Coaches Association (WBCA), on behalf of the Wade Coalition, announced the 2009-2010 preseason "Wade Watch" list for The State Farm Wade Trophy Division I Player of the Year. Making the list from Ohio State were junior Jantel Lavender and sophomore Samantha Prahalis as they were two of 25 named to the list, which is made up of top NCAA Division I student-athletes who best embody the spirit of Lily Margaret Wade. This is based on the following criteria: game and season statistics, leadership, character, effect on their team and overall playing ability.
August 21: The 2009-10 preseason candidates list for the Women’s Wooden Award was released, naming 31 student athletes. Jantel Lavender and Samantha Prahalis from Ohio State were two of the candidates.

Signees
May 20: Ohio State announced the signing of Aleksandra Dobranic, a 6-foot, 4-inch forward/center from Novi Sad, Serbia, to a National Letter of Intent to play for the Buckeyes beginning next season. Dobranic is a member of the Serbian Junior National Team. Dobranic is the fourth member of the Buckeyes’ 2009-10 recruiting class. She joins Emilee Harmon, a 6-2 forward and 2009 Associated Press Ohio Co-Player of the Year from Pickerington Central High School. The other recruits include Brianna Sanders, a 5-foot, 11-inch guard from Princeton High School in Cincinnati and Tayler Hill, a McDonald’s All-American and the two-time Gatorade Player of the Year from Minneapolis South.

Preseason
October 29: Ohio State junior Jantel Lavender was selected as the Big Ten Preseason Player of the Year by the conference coaches and a panel of media members.

Preseason WNIT

Regular season
The Buckeyes will host the Buckeye Classic from November 28–29.

Roster

Schedule

Player stats

Postseason
March 7: At 3:51 mark of the second half, Janel Lavender reached the 2,000 point plateau. She reached the plateau in her 100th career game and became the first female Buckeye to reach the mark as a junior. The other Buckeyes with 2,000 career points are Katie Smith (2,578) and Jessica Davenport (2,303). In addition, she is only the 15th Big Ten player to reach the 2,000 point plateau.

Big Ten Tournament

NCAA basketball tournament

Awards and honors
Jantel Lavender: Big Ten Preseason Player of the Year by the conference coaches and a panel of media members

Preseason All-Big Ten Coaches Team
JANTEL LAVENDER, Jr., C, OSU
Samantha Prahalis, So., G, OSU

Preseason All-Big Ten Media Team
JANTEL LAVENDER, Jr., C, OSU
Samantha Prahalis, So., G, OSU

Regular season

Postseason
Jantel Lavender, Big Ten tournament most outstanding player

Team players drafted into the WNBA

See also
2009–10 Big Ten women's basketball season
2009–10 Ohio State Buckeyes women's ice hockey season

References

External links
Official Site

Ohio State Buckeyes women's basketball seasons
Ohio State
Ohio State
Ohio State Buckeyes
Ohio State Buckeyes